The VACTERL association (also VATER association, and less accurately VACTERL syndrome) refers to a recognized group of birth defects which tend to co-occur (see below). This pattern is a recognized association, as opposed to a syndrome, because there is no known pathogenetic cause to explain the grouped incidence.

Each child with this condition can be unique. At present this condition is treated after birth with issues being approached one at a time. Some infants are born with symptoms that cannot be treated and they do not survive. Also, VACTERL association can be linked to other similar conditions such as Klippel Feil and Goldenhar syndrome including crossovers of conditions.

No specific genetic or chromosome problem has been identified with VACTERL association. VACTERL can be seen with some chromosomal defects such as Trisomy 18 and is more frequently seen in babies of diabetic mothers. VACTERL association, however, is most likely caused by multiple factors.

VACTERL association specifically refers to the abnormalities in structures derived from the embryonic mesoderm.

Signs and symptoms 
The following features are observed with VACTERL association: 
 V - Vertebral anomalies
 A - Anorectal malformations
 C - Cardiovascular anomalies
 T - Tracheoesophageal fistula
 E - Esophageal atresia
 R - Renal (Kidney) and/or radial anomalies
 L - Limb defects
Although it was not conclusive whether VACTERL should be defined by at least two or three component defects, it is typically defined by the presence of at least three of the above congenital malformations.

Spine 
Vertebral anomalies, or defects of the spinal column, usually consist of small (hypoplastic) vertebrae or hemivertebra where only one half of the bone is formed. About 80 percent of patients with VACTERL association will have vertebral anomalies. In early life these rarely cause any difficulties, although the presence of these defects on a chest x-ray may alert the physician to other defects associated with VACTERL. Later in life these spinal column abnormalities may put the child at risk for developing scoliosis, or curvature of the spine.

Anal defects 
Anal atresia or imperforate anus is seen in about 55 to 90 percent of patients with VACTERL association. These anomalies are usually noted at birth. It often require surgery in the first days of life. Sometimes babies will require several surgeries to fully reconstruct the intestine and anal canal.

Cardiac defects 
Up to 75 percent of patients with VACTERL association have been reported to have congenital heart disease. The most common heart defects seen with VACTERL association are ventricular septal defect (VSD), atrial septal defects and tetralogy of Fallot.
Less common defects are truncus arteriosus and transposition of the great arteries. It is subsequently thought that cardiac defects should be considered an extension of VACTERL.

Trachea and oesophagus 
Oesophageal atresia with tracheoesophageal fistula (TO fistula or TOF) is seen in about 70 percent of patients with VACTERL association, although it can frequently occur as an isolated defect. 15 to 33 percent of patients with TO fistulas will also have congenital heart disease. However these babies usually have uncomplicated heart defects, like a ventricular septal defect, which may not require any surgery.

Kidneys 
Kidney defects are seen in approximately 50 percent of patients with VACTERL association. In addition, up to 35 percent of patients with VACTERL association have a single umbilical artery (there are usually two arteries and one vein) which is often associated with additional kidney or urologic problems. Renal abnormalities in VACTERL association can be severe, with incomplete formation of one or both kidneys or urologic abnormalities such as obstruction of outflow of urine from the kidneys or severe reflux (backflow) of urine into the kidneys from the bladder. These problems can cause kidney failure early in life and may require kidney transplant. Many of these problems can be corrected surgically before any damage can occur.

Limbs 
Limb defects occur in up to 70 percent of babies with VACTERL association and include a displaced or hypoplastic thumb, extra digits (polydactyly), fusion of digits (syndactyly) and forearm defects such as radial aplasia. Babies with limb defects on both sides tend to have kidney or urologic defects on both sides, while babies with limb defects on only one side of the body tend to have kidney problems on that same side.

Extension 
Features secondary to VACTERL components are frequent enough to be considered an extension of VACTERL. These include: single umbilical artery, ambiguous genitalia, abdominal wall defects, diaphragmatic hernia, intestinal and respiratory anomalies, and oligohydramnios sequence defects.  Cardiac defects are thought to fit in this category.

Growth 
Many babies with VACTERL are born small and have difficulty with gaining weight. Babies with VACTERL association, however, do tend to have normal development and normal intelligence.

Pathology 
Patients with abnormal cardiac and kidney function may be more at risk for hemolytic uremic syndrome.

Diagnosis

Differential diagnosis 
 Baller–Gerold syndrome
 CHARGE syndrome
 Currarino syndrome
 DiGeorge syndrome
 Fanconi anemia
 Feingold syndrome
 Fryns syndrome
 MURCS association
 Oculo-auriculo-vertebral syndrome
 Opitz G/BBB syndrome
 Holt–Oram syndrome
 Pallister–Hall syndrome
 Townes–Brocks syndrome
 VACTERL with hydrocephalus

Management

Epidemiology 
The incidence of VACTERL association is estimated to be approximately 1 in 10,000 to 1 in 40,000 live-born infants. It is seen more frequently in infants born to diabetic mothers. While most cases are sporadic, there are clearly families who present with multiple involved members.

History 
The acronym VATER association was first described by Linda Quan, an emergency room physician, and David Smith, a man who was considered the father of dysmorphology in 1972, to define a non-random co-occurrence of the listed defects. Years later, research revealed that cardiac and renal abnormalities were common in the association, and the acronym was changed to VACTERL. However, no single cause was identified that links all these conditions together. Therefore, this VACTERL is termed as "association" instead of a "syndrome".

The differentiation of the acronyms VACTERL and VATER is due to the variation in defects determined at or prior to birth. VACTERL contains vertebral, anal, cardiac, trachea-esophageal, renal/kidney, and limb defects where as VATER only has vertebral, anal, trachea-esophageal, and renal defects. The "R" in VATER represented radial dysplasia.  Though the differences are clear, the physical defects vary from case to case.

See also 
 22q11 deletion syndrome
 Absent radius
 CHARGE Association
 Holt–Oram syndrome
 Feingold syndrome
 Pallister–Hall syndrome
 Townes–Brocks syndrome

References

Further reading

External links 

Congenital disorders
Syndromes affecting the heart
Syndromes with dysmelia
Rare syndromes